The Big Heat is a 1953 American film noir crime film directed by Fritz Lang starring Glenn Ford, Gloria Grahame, and Jocelyn Brando about a cop who takes on the crime syndicate that controls his city. William P. McGivern's serial in The Saturday Evening Post, published as a novel in 1953, was the basis for the screenplay, written by former crime reporter Sydney Boehm. The film was selected for inclusion in the National Film Registry of the Library of Congress in 2011.

Plot
Homicide detective Sergeant Dave Bannion, of the Kenport Police Department, is called to investigate the suicide of a rogue fellow officer, Tom Duncan. His wife, Bertha Duncan, says her husband had recently been in ill health. He left behind an envelope addressed to the district attorney, which she keeps under wraps and locks away in her safe-deposit box at the bank.

The mistress of the late cop, Lucy Chapman, contradicts Mrs. Duncan, telling Sgt. Bannion that Tom Duncan had not been in ill health, and had no reason to kill himself, but had recently agreed to a divorce with his wife. Meanwhile Duncan's widow refuses to explain the couple's luxurious home. The next day, Lieutenant Ted Wilks is under pressure from "upstairs" to close the case, and rebuffs Bannion. Lucy Chapman is found strangled to death, her body covered with cigarette burns. Although the Chapman case is in the sheriff's jurisdiction, Bannion investigates and receives threatening calls at his home. He confronts Mike Lagana, a mob boss that runs the city, and discovers that people are too scared to stand up to the crime syndicate. When Bannion ignores warnings to desist, his car is planted with explosives. The car bomb kills his wife, Katie. Accusing his superiors of corruption, Bannion chides corrupt Police Commissioner Higgins, accusing him of obeying the orders of Lagana. Higgins puts Bannion on immediate suspension and orders him to turn in his badge. Determined to find those responsible for his wife's murder, Bannion continues to investigate.

He hopes to discover a lead at a nightclub called "The Retreat". When Lagana's second-in-command, Vince Stone, punishes a woman there, burning her with a cigar butt, Bannion stands up to him and his thugs. This impresses Stone's girlfriend, Debby Marsh. The two hit it off and take a cab to the hotel where he is now living. When Debby accidentally reminds Bannion about his late wife, he tells her to leave. Debby reluctantly returns to Stone's penthouse. He accuses her of talking to Bannion about his activities and throws a pot of boiling coffee in her face. Higgins, who had been playing poker with Stone and his group there, takes her to a hospital.

Debby returns to Bannion at his hotel; the left side of her face badly burned and half-covered in bandages. For protection, he puts her in a hotel room close to his. Debby identifies the man who had arranged the planting of the car bomb as Larry Gordon, one of Stone's associates. She also tells him where Gordon is staying at. Bannion forces Gordon to admit to the car-bombing, and to reveal that Duncan's widow is blackmailing Stone and Lagana with incriminating documents. Bannion does not kill Gordon, but promises to spread the word that he talked. Afterward, Gordon is killed by Stone's men. Bannion then confronts Mrs. Duncan, accusing her of betraying Lucy Chapman and protecting Lagana and Stone. With his hands at her throat, Bannion tells Mrs. Duncan that if she is killed, the evidence she has against Lagana will be revealed. Before Bannion can follow through on his threats, cops sent by Lagana arrive, and he is forced to leave.

Bannion goes to deal with Stone when Wilks arrives, now prepared to take a stand against the mob and his corrupt boss. Debby goes to Mrs. Duncan and starts talking about their respective associations with gangsters. When Mrs. Duncan attempts to phone Stone for help, Debby shoots her dead.

Bannion tails Stone, who returns to his penthouse, where Debby has been waiting for him. She throws boiling coffee in his face in an act of revenge. In retaliation, Stone shoots her. After a short gun battle, Bannion captures Stone. As Debby dies on the floor, she confesses to shooting Mrs. Duncan. Stone is arrested for murder and officer Duncan's damning evidence in the note he left behind for the D.A. is made public. Lagana and Higgins are indicted, and Bannion is reinstated to his job as a homicide detective.

Cast

Production
The film was based on a fictional serial by William P. McGivern, which appeared in the Saturday Evening Post from December 1952 and was published as a novel in 1953. Initially, McGivern's novel was to be produced by Jerry Wald, who wanted either Paul Muni, George Raft or Edward G. Robinson (who worked with director Fritz Lang in Woman in the Window and Scarlet Street) for the role of Dave Bannion. Columbia Pictures paid $40,000 for McGivern's novel. Lang directed the film while Sydney Boehm wrote it.

Boehm changed many details in the novel. Commissioner Higgins is not in the novel and Lieutenant Wilks is the corrupt policeman. An honest policeman called Cranston, who was in the novel, was omitted from the film.

In the novel, it is not known until the end that the widow of the policeman who had killed himself (named Deery in the book, Duncan in the film) was blackmailing Lagana. Debby shoots her and then mortally wounds herself. After Stone is cornered by Bannion, he is killed by another policeman. Instead of taking place in Philadelphia, the film takes place in the fictional city of Kenport.

Columbia wanted Marilyn Monroe to play the part of Debby Marsh but did not want to pay the fee 20th Century Fox demanded for the loan of their star, so Gloria Grahame was cast instead.

Rex Reason was slated to play either Tierney or Detective Burke, but his agent wanted a larger part. In the end, Reason was not cast and Peter Whitney and Robert Burton got the roles of Tierney and Burke respectively.

In the scene at the bar where Stone and Bannion first meet, the house band is performing "Put the Blame on Mame," a song also heard in the 1946 noir classic Gilda, also starring Ford, and also produced by Columbia.

Preservation
The Academy Film Archive preserved The Big Heat in 1997.

Critical response

The New York Times and Variety both gave The Big Heat very positive reviews at the time. Bosley Crowther of the Times described Glenn Ford "as its taut, relentless star" and praised Lang for bringing "forth a hot one with a sting." Variety characterized Lang's direction as "tense" and "forceful." Critic Roger Ebert subsequently praised the film's supporting actors and added the film to his personal canon of "Great Movies".

Writer David M. Meyer states that the film never overcomes the basic repulsiveness of its hero, but notes that some parts of the film, though violent, are better than the film as a whole: "Best known is Gloria Grahame's disfigurement at the hands of psycho-thug Lee Marvin, who flings hot coffee into her face."

According to film critic Grant Tracey, the film turns the role of the femme fatale on its head: "Whereas many noirs contain the tradition of the femme-fatale, the deadly spiderwoman who destroys her man and his family and career, The Big Heat inverts this narrative paradigm, making Ford [Det. Bannion] the indirect agent of fatal destruction. All four women he meets—from clip joint singer, Lucy Chapman, to gun moll Debby—are destroyed."

Awards and honors
The film is recognized by American Film Institute in these lists:
 2001: AFI's 100 Years...100 Thrills – Nominated
 2005: AFI's 100 Years...100 Movie Quotes:
 Debby Marsh: "We're sisters under the mink." – Nominated
 2008: AFI's 10 Top 10:
 Nominated Mystery Film
 Nominated Gangster Film

In December 2011, The Big Heat was selected for inclusion in the Library of Congress' National Film Registry. Proclaiming it "one of the great post-war noir films", the Registry stated that The Big Heat "manages to be both stylized and brutally realistic, a signature of its director Fritz Lang."

See also
 List of American films of 1953

References

Sources
 Sarris, Andrew. 1998. “You Ain’t Heard Nothin’ Yet.” The American Talking Film History & Memory, 1927-1949. Oxford University Press.

External links

 
 
 
 
 
 The Big Heat at the Greatest Film web site

1953 films
1950s crime thriller films
American crime thriller films
American black-and-white films
Film noir
Columbia Pictures films
Edgar Award-winning works
American films about revenge
Films about suicide
Films based on American novels
Films based on crime novels
Films directed by Fritz Lang
American police detective films
United States National Film Registry films
1950s English-language films
1950s American films